Denis Law  (born 24 February 1940) is a Scottish former footballer who played as a forward. His career as a football player began at Second Division Huddersfield Town in 1956. After four years at Huddersfield, he was signed by Manchester City for an estimated transfer fee of £55,000, which set a new British record. Law spent one year there before Torino bought him for £110,000, this time setting a new record fee for a transfer involving a British player. Although he played well in Italy, he found it difficult to settle there and signed for Manchester United in 1962, setting another British record transfer fee of £115,000.

Law spent 11 years at Manchester United, where he scored 237 goals in 404 appearances. His goals tally places him third in the club's history, behind Wayne Rooney and Bobby Charlton. He was nicknamed The King and The Lawman by supporters, and Denis the Menace by opposing supporters. He is the only Scottish player to have won the Ballon d'Or award, doing so in 1964, and helped his club win the First Division in 1965 and 1967. He missed their European Cup triumph in 1968 through injury.

Law left Manchester United in 1973 to return to Manchester City for a season, and represented Scotland at the 1974 FIFA World Cup. He played only two competitive games in the 1974–75 season, retiring before the start of the League programme proper. Law played for Scotland a total of 55 times and jointly holds the Scottish international record goal tally with 30 goals. Law holds a United record for scoring 46 competitive goals in a single season.

Early life
Law was born in Aberdeen, Scotland, to George Law, a fisherman, and his wife, Robina; he was the youngest of seven children, four boys and three girls. The Law family were not well off and lived in a council tenement flat at Printfield Terrace in Woodside, Aberdeen. He went barefoot until he was 12 years old and wore handed-down shoes throughout his adolescence; his first pair of football boots came as a second-hand birthday present from a neighbour, which he received as a teenager.

He supported Aberdeen and watched them when he had enough money to do so, watching local non-league teams when he did not. His obsession with football led to him turning down a place at Aberdeen Grammar School, because he would have had to play rugby there. Instead, he attended Powis Academy in Aberdeen. Despite having a serious squint, he showed great promise once he was moved from full back to inside-left, and was selected for Scotland Schoolboys.

Club career

Huddersfield Town
In the 1954–55 season, he was spotted by Archie Beattie, a scout for Huddersfield Town, who invited 14-year-old Law to go for a trial. When he got there, the manager said, "The boy's a freak. Never did I see a less likely football prospect – weak, puny and bespectacled." However, to Law's surprise, they signed him on 3 April 1955. While he was at Huddersfield, he had an operation to correct his squint, which greatly enhanced his self-confidence.

Huddersfield's relegation to what was then the Second Division made it easier for Law to get a game, and he made his debut on 24 December 1956, aged only sixteen, in a 2–1 win over Notts County. Manchester United's manager Matt Busby shortly offered Huddersfield £10,000 for Law, a substantial amount of money for a teenage footballer at that time, but the club turned the offer down. Bill Shankly was manager of Huddersfield between 1956 and 1959, and when he left for Liverpool he wanted to take Law with him, but Liverpool were unable to afford him at that time.

Manchester City
In March 1960, Law signed for Manchester City for what was then a British record transfer fee, estimated to be £55,000, although Law's share of the fee was "precisely nothing". Once again, Matt Busby had attempted to sign Law for Manchester United, but United's cross-city rivals beat them to Law's signature.

City had narrowly avoided relegation from Division I the previous season, and Law genuinely felt that Huddersfield had a better team at the time. He made his debut on 19 March, and scored in a 4–3 defeat to Leeds United. In April 1961, he scored two goals in a 4–1 win over Aston Villa that ensured City's survival in Division One.

Although he had thought about leaving, he was playing well and in 1961 Law scored an incredible six goals in an FA Cup tie against Luton Town. However, the match was abandoned with twenty minutes to go, so his six goals did not count. To make matters worse for him, Luton won the replay 3–1, and City were knocked out of the Cup.

Although he enjoyed his time at City, he wanted to play in a more successful side and was sold to the Italian club Torino in the summer of 1961.

Torino
Law moved to Torino for a fee of £110,000, (a record fee for a transfer involving a British player) and was accompanied by Joe Baker who had signed from Scottish side Hibernian. Law's time in Italy did not go according to plan. Another Italian club, Internazionale, tried to prevent him becoming a Torino player as soon as he arrived, claiming he had signed a pre-contract agreement with them, although they dropped this claim before the season started.

Players in the UK were not treated well at the time, and the maximum wage for footballers had only recently been abolished there, so he was pleasantly surprised to find that pre-season training was based in a luxury hotel in the Alps. However, Torino took performance-related pay to something of an extreme, giving the players large sums of money when the team won, but little, if any, when they lost. Like many British footballers who have gone to play in Italy, Law did not like the style of football and found adapting to it difficult. The ultra-defensive catenaccio system was popular there at the time, so forwards did not get many chances to score.

On 7 February 1962, he was injured in a car crash when his teammate Joe Baker drove the wrong way around a roundabout and clipped the kerb as he tried to turn the car around, flipping it over. Baker was almost killed, but Law's injuries were not life-threatening.

By April, he had put in a transfer request, which was ignored. The final straw for Law came in a match against Napoli when he was sent off. After the match, he was told that Torino's coach, Beniamino Santos, had instructed the referee to send him off because he was angry at Law for taking a throw in, which he had been told not to do. Law walked out, and was told that he would be transferred to Manchester United. A few days later, however, he was told that he was being sold to Juventus and that the small print in his contract committed him to going there whether he wanted to or not. He responded by flying home to Aberdeen, knowing that Torino would not get a penny in transfer fees if he refused to play at Juventus. He eventually signed for United on 10 July 1962, for a new British record fee of £115,000.

Although his time in Italy was mixed, Law was voted number one foreign player in Italy ahead of teammate Joe Baker, Fiorentina winger Kurt Hamrin and Inter Milan midfielder Luis Suarez. The lifestyle and culture of a foreign country was an eye-opener for the young Scotsman, and the medical expertise and sports science in Italy was far ahead of what was available in the UK at the time. Ultimately though, Law found the football to be joyless and overly defensive, with him being subjected to violent man marking and heavy tackling on a frequent basis.

Manchester United

Glory years

Law moved back to Manchester, boarding with the same landlady with whom he had lived during his time as a City player. His first match for United was against West Bromwich Albion on 18 August 1962, and he made an excellent start, scoring after only seven minutes. The match finished in a 2–2 draw. However, United's form had been erratic since the Munich air disaster in 1958, and because of their inconsistency they spent the season fighting relegation. In a league match against Leicester City Law scored a hat trick but United still lost. They found form in the FA Cup though, with Law scoring another hat trick in a 5–0 win against his old club Huddersfield Town, and they went on to reach the final against Leicester City. Leicester were strong favourites, having finished fourth in the league, but Law scored the first goal as United won 3–1 in what turned out to be the only FA Cup final of his career. He also married his wife Diana that season, on 11 December 1962.

An incident took place that season that Law felt had repercussions in later years. In a match against West Brom on 15 December 1962, the referee Gilbert Pullin consistently goaded Law with taunts such as "Oh, you clever so and so, you can't play", and after the match, Law and his manager Matt Busby reported the matter to the Football Association. A disciplinary committee decided that Pullin should be severely censured, but he did not accept their verdict and quit the game. Law later claimed that "in the eyes of some referees, I was a marked man" and blamed the incident for the "staggeringly heavy punishments" that he received later in his career.

Law scored a number of goals early in the 1963–64 season and was selected to play for a Rest of the World side against England at Wembley, scoring their goal in a 2–1 defeat. He later described this as the greatest honour of his career. His season was interrupted by a 28-day suspension for a sending off that he received against Aston Villa. The unusually cold winter forced United to play many of their fixtures in a short time, and their results suffered. Law later blamed this for United's failure to win a trophy in that season. Despite the lack of silverware, Law enjoyed a prolific goalscoring season and finished the campaign with 46 goals in all competitions, still a club record today.

In 1964–65, Law won the Ballon d'Or award, and Manchester United won their first league title since Munich. Law's 28 league goals that season made him the First Division's top scorer.

The following season, Law injured his right knee while playing for Scotland against Poland on 21 October 1965. He had previously had an operation on the same knee while at Huddersfield, and the injury was to trouble him for the rest of his career.

In 1966, Law asked United's manager Matt Busby to give him a pay rise at his next contract renewal, and threatened to leave the club if he did not get one. Busby immediately placed Law on the transfer list, announcing that "no player will hold this club to ransom, no player". When Law went to see him, Busby pulled out a written apology for him to sign, showing it to the press once he had done so. Law later claimed that Busby had used the incident to warn other players not to do the same thing, but had secretly given him the pay rise. Despite all this, Law scored 23 goals in 36 league appearances during 1966–67, helping United win the league title again.

In 1968, United won the European Cup for the first time, but Law's knee injury was causing him serious problems and he missed both the semi-final second leg and the final as a result. He was regularly given cortisone injections to ease the pain, but playing while the knee was still injured was causing long-term damage. He visited a specialist in January 1968 who wrote to United claiming that a previous operation to remove the cartilage from the knee had failed and recommending that a second operation be performed, but Law was not shown the report for several years and had to continue full training.

In 1968–69, United reached the semi-final of the European Cup, playing AC Milan. United lost the first leg in the San Siro 2–0, winning the second leg at Old Trafford 1–0 with a Bobby Charlton goal. Having scored seven times in the 10–2 aggregate first round victory over Waterford United, Law finished as top scorer in the tournament with 9 goals.

Decline
Wilf McGuinness took over as first team coach at the start of the 1969–70 season. United finished eighth in the league, but Law missed almost all of the season through injury, and in April 1970 he was transfer listed for £60,000. Nobody made a bid for him, so he stayed at United.

After a poor 1970–71 season, United appointed Frank O'Farrell as manager. They made a good start to the 1971–72 season and finished 1971 five points clear at the top of the league, with Law having scored twelve goals. However, results deteriorated and they finished the season in eighth place. Law scored in the first match of the following season, 1972–73, but his knee injury was troubling him again, and he failed to score for the rest of the season. The poor results continued and O'Farrell was sacked.

Law recommended that United replace O'Farrell with Tommy Docherty, whom he knew from his time playing with the Scottish national side. The club followed his recommendation, and things started well, with the team's improved results lifting them into mid-table. Law was given a free transfer by Tommy Docherty in the summer of 1973, after 11 years at the club during which he had scored a total of 237 goals in 404 games in all competitions, as well as collecting two league title medals and an FA Cup winner's medal. Only Bobby Charlton (who retired in 1973) and Wayne Rooney have scored more goals for United.

Return to Manchester City
Law was offered a contract by Manchester City manager Johnny Hart. He scored two goals on his second debut for City, against Birmingham City in the opening game of the 1973–74 season. He made 27 full appearances and two as substitute in that season, including City's 2–1 defeat in the League Cup final against Wolves. In City's last game of the 1973–74 season against Manchester United at Old Trafford, Law's 81st-minute back-heeled goal gave City a 1–0 lead but, thinking his goal might relegate United, Law did not celebrate the goal. Results of the day's other matches meant that United were relegated whatever their result, but Law did not know that at the time. A number of pitch invasions by United fans followed, and Law walked off the pitch with his head down as he was substituted. The pitch invasions forced the referee to abandon the game in the 85th minute. After a review, the Football League decided that the result should stand.

Law had a contract with Manchester City for the 1974–75 season, but new manager Tony Book told him that he would only be playing reserve team football if he stayed at the club. He did not want to end his career in this way, so he retired from professional football in the summer of 1974. Law played two games for Manchester City in the season 1974–75, in the pre-season Texaco Cup tournament, scoring the last goal of his career in the game against Sheffield United at Bramall Lane on 6 August 1974. His last professional game was the 2–1 victory against Oldham Athletic at Maine Road on 10 August 1974. He formally retired on 26 August 1974.

International career

Law was not chosen to play for Scotland in the 1958 FIFA World Cup, but was given his debut in a British Home Championship match against Wales on 18 October 1958 by Matt Busby, who managed Scotland on a temporary basis for two matches. Law scored Scotland's second goal in a 3–0 win over the Welsh at Ninian Park. He played but did not score in Scotland's match against England on 15 April 1961. Scotland lost the match 9–3, and Law described it as his "blackest day". While with Torino, Law continued to play for Scotland, although the club were not keen to release him for international matches and had put a clause into his contract stating that they were not obliged to do so.

Law was chosen for the Rest of the World team that faced England in the FA Centenary match in 1963.

Law injured his right knee while playing for Scotland against Poland on 21 October 1965. Law scored in Scotland's famous 3–2 victory over England on 15 April 1967 in the 1967 British Home Championship, less than a year after England had become world champions. Manchester United won the league that season, but Law felt that the victory over England was even more satisfying.

Scotland reached the World Cup finals in the summer of 1974, for the first time since 1958. Although he had not played much first team football in the preceding season, Law was included in the squad and played in their first match, against Zaire. He did not score, but Scotland won 2–0. Law was "very disappointed" not to be picked for the following match against Brazil, and was not selected for the following match against Yugoslavia either. Although Scotland were not defeated in any of their matches, they did not qualify for the second phase and were out of the World Cup. The match against Zaire proved to be the last of Law's 55 appearances for Scotland.

Law jointly holds the Scottish international record goal tally with 30 goals.

Personal life
He first met his wife-to-be, Diana, in an Aberdeenshire dancehall when they were both still teenagers. They married in December 1962 and went on to have five children. Their daughter, also called Diana, worked for several years in the Manchester United press office. Their other children are Gary, Andrew, Robert and Iain. Denis Law and his wife still live in the Manchester area.

Since retiring as a player, Law has often worked on radio and television summarising and presenting games. He was one of the first sport news presenters of Granada Reports and was the sub-presenter of Granada Television's Kick Off Match, the equivalent of LWT's The Big Match. He appeared as a special guest on the TV guest show This Is Your Life on 19 February 1975, months after retiring as a player.

He was made an Inaugural Inductee of the English Football Hall of Fame in 2002 in recognition of his impact on the English game. On 23 February 2002, a statue of Law (alongside George Best and Bobby Charlton) was unveiled at Old Trafford, in the part of the stadium known as the Scoreboard End. He had a successful operation to treat prostate cancer in November 2003 and was awarded honorary degrees from the Universities of Aberdeen and St. Andrews in 2005, and Robert Gordon University in 2017.

The emergence of Dutch international Dennis Bergkamp in the 1990s uncovered a story that the player's parents were fans of Law and named their son after him. However, Dutch authorities refused to recognise the name unless it was spelt with two ns as they felt it was otherwise too similar to the female name Denise.

On 25 November 2005, Law was at the bedside of former United teammate George Best as he died of multiple organ failure.

In May 2008, at the City of Manchester Stadium, he (with UEFA president Michel Platini) presented the medals to the winners of the UEFA Cup, Zenit Saint Petersburg and their opponents, Scottish side Rangers.

In February 2010, Law was named as patron of the UK based charity Football Aid, taking over from the late Sir Bobby Robson.

In 2012 he established the Denis Law Legacy Trust, a registered charity that operates programmes and activities focussed around community engagement and widening sporting participation. The charity aims to reduce instances of youth crime and anti-social behaviour; promote health and wellbeing and encourage inclusivity through sport, physical activity and creative endeavour  collaborating on community projects like Scotland's first Cruyff Court in Aberdeen.

In 2012, a statue to Law, commissioned by the Denis Law Legacy Trust, was unveiled at the entrance to Aberdeen Sports Village (a facility he had formally opened two years earlier) depicting his pose after scoring for Scotland against England in 1967.

Law was appointed Commander of the Order of the British Empire (CBE) in the 2016 New Year Honours for services to football and charity. In 2017, he received the Freedom of the City of Aberdeen.

In August 2021, it was announced that he had been diagnosed with Alzheimer's disease and vascular dementia.

In November 2021 a second statue of Law was unveiled in Aberdeen city centre.

Career statistics

Club

International

Honours
Manchester United
 Football League First Division: 1964–65, 1966–67
 FA Cup: 1962–63
 Charity Shield: 1965, 1967
 European Cup: 1967–68

Scotland national team
 British Home Championship: 1959–60 (shared), 1961–62, 1962–63, 1963–64 (shared), 1966–67, 1971–72 (shared)

Individual
 Ballon d'Or: 1964
 World Soccer World XI: 1964
 European Cup top scorer: 1968–69
 Football League 100 Legends: 1998
 PFA Merit Award: 1975
 Scottish FA International Roll of Honour (players with 50+ caps): inducted in 1988
 FWA Tribute Award: 1994
 Inaugural Inductee of the English Football Hall of Fame: 2002
 Scotland's Golden Player: Most Outstanding Player of the past 50 years by the Scottish Football Association (November 2003, to celebrate UEFA's Jubilee)
 Scottish Football Hall of Fame: inducted in 2004
 PFA Team of the Century (1907–1976): 2007

Freedom of Aberdeen, 2017

See also
List of footballers in England by number of league goals (200+)
List of Scotland national football team captains
 List of Scotland national football team hat-tricks

References
Notes

General

Specific

External links

Photos & stats at sporting-heroes.net
Short biography on the official Manchester United website
English Football Hall of Fame Profile
UEFA.com – Scotland's Golden Player
BBC Archive Collections:Football Legends – Denis Law
The Denis Law Legacy Trust

1940 births
Living people
Footballers from Aberdeen
Scottish footballers
Association football forwards
Huddersfield Town A.F.C. players
Manchester City F.C. players
Torino F.C. players
Manchester United F.C. players
English Football League players
Serie A players
English Football League representative players
UEFA Champions League winning players
UEFA Champions League top scorers
Scotland under-23 international footballers
Scotland international footballers
1974 FIFA World Cup players
Ballon d'Or winners
UEFA Golden Players
Scottish Football Hall of Fame inductees
English Football Hall of Fame inductees
Scottish expatriate footballers
Scottish expatriate sportspeople in Italy
Expatriate footballers in Italy
Commanders of the Order of the British Empire
FA Cup Final players
People with Alzheimer's disease